Sarah Eileen Huffman (born March 5, 1984) is an American former professional soccer player who last played for Portland Thorns FC of the NWSL.

Early life
Huffman was born in Danbury, Connecticut. She grew up in Flower Mound, Texas and attended Marcus High School.

University of Virginia
Huffman attended the University of Virginia. A four-year starter, she is one of the top players in the school's history. She was a two-time NSCAA All-American, a two-time Soccer America MVP, and a three-time first team All-ACC selection.

In 2004, she was named the ACC Defensive Player of the Year and was also Co-MVP of the ACC Tournament as the Cavaliers won the first conference championship in school history. She was named Virginia State Player of the Year and was a finalist for Soccer Buzz National Player of the Year.

As a senior in 2005, she was named Soccer Buzz All-American, Soccer America MVP, and NSCAA All-American.

She ended her collegiate career with 12 goals and 28 assists (second most assists in school history).

Playing career

Club

Huffman was a member of the 2007 W-League champion, Washington Freedom.

In 2008, she played for Norwegian team, Røa IL, and helped the team win the Norwegian Women's Cup.

In 2009, Huffman was the number one pick in Round 1 of the 2008 WPS General Draft and signed with the Washington Freedom in Women's Professional Soccer. Under new ownership, the team moved to Florida and was renamed magicJack (WPS).

In 2012, after the WPS folded, Huffman signed with the Pali Blues in the W-League. She helped the team to an undefeated season and the Western Conference championship title.

In 2013, Huffman signed with the Western New York Flash.

April 5, 2014 Huffman was traded with a player to be named later to the Portland Thorns for Courtney Wetzel, Kathryn Williamson, and a first-round pick in the 2015 NWSL College Draft. That pick later became Jaelene Hinkle. Huffman had earlier decided to live in Portland in the house she bought with her spouse Abby Wambach, who will play 2014 with Western New York Flash. April 7, 2014, Portland Thorns revealed that the player to be named later was Verónica Boquete.

November 18, 2014 Huffman announced her retirement from professional soccer.

International
Huffman was a member of the U-16, U-17, U-19, U-21, and U-23 United States women's national soccer teams. She helped her team win the 2002 FIFA U-19 Women's World Championship and won the Nordic Cup with the U-21s in 2004, 2005, and 2007.

In 2010, she was called to play with the United States women's national soccer team.

Coaching career
Huffman is a volunteer assistant coach at her alma mater, University of Virginia.

Personal life
Huffman resides in Portland, Oregon. Her nickname is "Huffy."  Huffman came out as gay in a statement on the Athlete Ally website supporting equality in sports. On October 5, 2013, she married her longtime girlfriend, Abby Wambach, in Hawaii. In September 2016, in a new autobiography, Wambach announced that she and Huffman were divorcing. Their divorce was finalized in 2016.

References

External links

 US Soccer player profile
Women's Professional Soccer player profile
Washington Freedom (W-League) player profile 
 Pali Blues player profile
 
 

1984 births
Living people
Virginia Cavaliers women's soccer players
Røa IL players
American expatriate women's soccer players
American expatriate sportspeople in Norway
Expatriate footballers in Norway
Washington Freedom players
Soccer players from Texas
MagicJack (WPS) players
People from Flower Mound, Texas
National Women's Soccer League players
Western New York Flash players
LGBT people from Texas
LGBT association football players
American LGBT sportspeople
LGBT people from Connecticut
American women's soccer players
Women's association football midfielders
Portland Thorns FC players
Bisexual sportspeople
United States women's international soccer players
Women's Professional Soccer players